The Predator is the third studio album by American rapper Ice Cube. It was released on November 17, 1992 through Lench Mob Records and Priority Records. The album was released just within months of the 1992 Los Angeles riots;
many songs comment on racial tensions in the United States. The production on the album was primarily handled by DJ Pooh, Sir Jinx, Torcha Chamba and DJ Muggs. The title is in part reference to the movie Predator 2, and the album itself includes samples from the film.

The Predator was supported by three singles: "It Was a Good Day", "Check Yo Self" and "Wicked". The album received generally positive reviews from critics and was also a commercial success. It debuted at number one on the Billboard 200 chart, selling 193,000 copies in its first week. The album was certified double platinum by the Recording Industry Association of America (RIAA) in November 2001.

Background 
In the opening song, "When Will They Shoot," Ice Cube addressed criticisms of anti-Semitism he received for his last effort, Death Certificate:

White man is something I tried to study,
But I got my hands bloody, yeah.
They say I can sing like a jaybird
But, nigga, don’t say the j-word
I thought they was buggin'
'Cause to us, Uncle Sam is Hitler without an oven
Burnin' our black skin
Bomb a neighborhood, then push the crack in

Elsewhere "We Had to Tear This Mothafucka Up" is directed at the LA Police officers acquitted in the Rodney King trial, an event that ignited the 1992 LA Riots. The similarly themed "Who Got the Camera?" imagines a scenario in which a black man is subjected to police brutality. The songs are broken up by interludes involving interviews with Ice Cube and what appears to be a debate between members of a congregation or talk-show audience.

"Now I Gotta Wet’cha" is the source of the popular phrase "It’s on like Donkey Kong." Since the song's release, the quote has been used in sports, commercials, movies, and television with a huge surge in usage from the years 2000 through 2005. In 2010, Nintendo trademarked the phrase in order to promote the Wii game Donkey Kong Country Returns.

Singles
The album spawned three hit singles: "It Was a Good Day," which was a hit in March 1993; "Check Yo Self"; and "Wicked" (which was later covered by nu metal band Korn featuring Deftones vocalist Chino Moreno rapping the verses with slightly modified lyrics). Both the album and single version of "Check Yo Self" include an appearance from Das EFX, with the latter's single featuring a remix utilizing a sample of Grandmaster Flash's "The Message". The song also received continuous radio and MTV play.

Critical reception 

Although not as lauded as his previous efforts, The Predator was well received. Entertainment Weekly called it "Ice Cube's strongest, most cohesive work yet". Spin called it a record that "demands to be heard" (1/93, p. 61). Q included it in its "90 Best Albums of the 1990s" (12/99, p. 74).

Commercial performance 
The Predator debuted at number one on the Billboard 200 chart, selling 193,000 copies in its first week. This became Ice Cube's first US number one debut. On November 16, 2001, the album was certified double platinum by the Recording Industry Association of America (RIAA) for sales of over two million copies. As of January 2003, the album has sold 2.2 million copies in the United States, according to Nielsen SoundScan.

Legacy 
The album was included in the book 1001 Albums You Must Hear Before You Die.

In a 2014 interview with rapper and producer Q-Tip, actor Leonardo DiCaprio expresses his admiration for The Predator. He stated that the album was the "magnum opus of Ice Cube's solo career" and it was a "voice for the angry and unheard during the 90s".

Use in media
In the comedy series Fresh Off the Boat, 11-year old Eddie Huang (Hudson Yang) tries to impress his neighbor and babysitter Nichole (Luna Blaise) with a copy of The Predator featuring a huge Parental Advisory label. She decides to keep his copy after listening to it babysitting him and they end up bonding over it.

"It Was a Good Day" made an appearance in the video games The Last of Us Part II and   Grand Theft Auto: San Andreas.

Track listing

Charts

Weekly charts

Year-end charts

Certifications

See also 
List of number-one albums of 1992 (U.S.)
List of number-one R&B albums of 1992 (U.S.)

References 

Ice Cube albums
1992 albums
Albums produced by DJ Muggs
Albums produced by DJ Pooh
Priority Records albums
Political hip hop albums
Political music albums by American artists